Gambei ("the broken wall") is a Dagbamba funeral practice of punching a hole in the zoŋ of a yidana creating a second way in and out of their home. It symbolizes rebellion and a sense of freedom for the deceased household, particularly for their children who no longer feel accountable to the reproach of the family head due to their absence.

During funeral rituals where Kambon-waa is to be performed in the compound of the yidana, the musicians are only allowed to enter and exit the house in a single file through the gambei playing chakowili. While still outside, or after they have regathered in a circle inside the compound do they resume playing other rhythms.

References

Dagbaŋ culture
Ghanaian culture